Bény is a commune in the Ain department in eastern France.

Geography
The bief du Lignon forms the commune's southeastern border, then flows into the Solnan, which forms most of its northeastern border.

The Sevron flows northwest through the middle of the commune.

Population

See also
Communes of the Ain department

References

Communes of Ain